Šmartno v Tuhinju is a village in the Tuhinj Valley in the Municipality of Kamnik in the Upper Carniola region of Slovenia.

Church

The parish church in the village is dedicated to Saint Martin.

References

External links

Šmartno v Tuhinju on Geopedia

Populated places in the Municipality of Kamnik